Sharon Schwartz (born March 14, 1940) is a former member of the Kansas House of Representatives, who represented the 106th district from 1997 to 2017.

Since 1983, Schwartz has worked as business manager for Pork Chop Acres, Incorporated. She has been a member of the Kansas Farm Bureau, Kansas Pork Producers, the National Pork Producers Council, and the National Federation of Independent Business.

Committee membership
 Taxation
 Transportation
 Economic Development and Tourism
 Local Government (Chair)
 Select Committee on KPERS (Chair)
 Joint Committee on Economic Development
 Joint Committee on Pensions, Investments and Benefits

Major donors
The top 5 donors to Schwartz's 2008 campaign:
1. Kansas Contractors Association PAC 	$1,000 	
2. Kansas Realtors PAC 	$500 	
3. Kansas Hospital Association 	$500 	
4. Kansas Dental Association 	$500 	
5. Twin Valley Telephone 	$500

References

External links
 Kansas Legislature - Sharon Schwartz
 Project Vote Smart profile
 Kansas Votes profile
 State Surge - Legislative and voting track record
 Campaign contributions: 1996,1998,2000, 2002, 2004, 2006, 2008

Republican Party members of the Kansas House of Representatives
Living people
Women state legislators in Kansas
1940 births
21st-century American politicians
21st-century American women politicians
20th-century American women politicians
20th-century American politicians